Pleasant Lake station is a former train station located in Harwich, Massachusetts on Cape Cod. The station building has been repurposed as the Pleasant Lake General Store.

References

External links

Harwich, Massachusetts
Old Colony Railroad Stations on Cape Cod
Stations along Old Colony Railroad lines
Former railway stations in Massachusetts
Railway stations in Barnstable County, Massachusetts